The Celtic Cisalpine Gaulish inscriptions are frequently combined with the Lepontic inscriptions under the term Celtic language remains in northern Italy. While it is possible that the Lepontii were autochthonous to Northern Italy since the end of the 2nd millennium BC, it is known from ancient sources that the Gauls invaded the regions north of the river Po in several waves since the 5th century BC. They apparently took over the art of writing from the Lepontii, including some of the orthographic peculiarities. There are 20 Cisalpine Gaulish inscriptions, five of them longer than just one or two words. The inscriptions stem largely from the area south of the Lepontians.

There is an ongoing debate whether Cisalpine Gaulish is a dialect of Gaulish (e.g. Schumacher 2004),
or a historical or dialectical continuation of Lepontic (e.g. Eska 2010).  In the latter case, the term Cisalpine Celtic refers to the two together, contrasting with Transalpine Celtic (traditionally Transalpine Gaulish) for the Celtic language on the other side of the Alps.

Lepontic compared to Cisalpine Gaulish

Common features (not in Transalpine Gaulish)

 nn rather than Transalpine Gaulish *nd: *ande- > -ane-, *and(e)-are- > an-are-, ?*and-o-kom- > ano-Ko-

 nt rather than Transalpine Gaulish *nt: *kom-bog(i)yos > -Ko-PoKios, Quintus → KuiTos, *arganto- > arKaTo-, *longam > loKan

  s(s) rather than Transalpine Gaulish *χs: *eχs > es in es-aneKoti, es-oPnos

Differences between Cisalpine Gaulish and Lepontic

 Endings in *-m# instead of Gaulish -n#: TeuoχTonion, loKan vs. Lep. Pruiam, Palam, uinom naśom (but also Cisalpine-Gaulish PoiKam, aTom [or: atoś?], and the varying use of *-m# and *-n# throughout the history of Gaulish).

 word formation: ending of 3rd person sg./pl. preterite in -u, cp. karnitu(s) (Gaulish karnitou), versus Lepontic KariTe, KaliTe (but also Transalpine Gaulish dede)

 Gaulish patronymic suffix is typically -ikno/a vs. Lepontic -alo-, -ala-, -al (but also mixed in Late (?) Lepontic)

See also
 Lepontic language
 Gaulish language
 Continental Celtic languages
 Ancient peoples of Italy
 Cisalpine Gaul
 Cisalpine Celtic

References

Bibliography
 Stifter, D. 2020. Cisalpine Celtic. Language, Writing, Epigraphy. Aelaw Booklet 8. Zaragoza: Prensas de la Universidad de Zaragoza.
 Stifter, D. 2020. «Cisalpine Celtic», Palaeohispanica 20: 335-365.

External links 
 "Languages and Cultures of Ancient Italy. Historical Linguistics and Digital Models", Project fund by the Italian Ministry of University and Research (P.R.I.N. 2017)

Continental Celtic languages
Languages of ancient Italy
Extinct Celtic languages
Extinct languages of Europe
Gaulish language